Viscacha rats are a group of rodents in the family Octodontidae.  All species are found in Argentina. They are placed in the following genera:

Genus Octomys
 O. mimax , mountain viscacha rat, found in the Andes
Genus Pipanacoctomys
 P. aureus, the golden viscacha rat, found near a salt flat
Genus Tympanoctomys (4 species, 3 extant), found in desert shrubland near salt flats
 T. barrerae, the plains viscacha rat
 T. kirchnerorum, Kirchner's viscacha rat,
 T. loschalchalerosorum, the Chalchalero viscacha rat
 †T. cordubensis

Rodents
Animal common name disambiguation pages